Lieutenant-General Owen Wynne (1665–1737) was an Irish general and commander in the British Army, and a member of the Parliament of Ireland.

He was the third son of Owen Wynne, who settled in Ireland about the year 1688, having previously lived in Wales. In 1688 he was serving in the army of James II, but being a Protestant, he transferred his allegiance to the Prince of Orange on the breaking out of the Glorious Revolution. He was with Major-General Kirke's force sent from England to the relief of Londonderry, and he also took some part in the defence of Enniskillen, and served through the War in Ireland.

Owen Wynne was appointed a major in his brother James Wynne's Dragoons on 1 November 1694, and served with his Regiment through the Flanders campaign of 1694 to 1697, being promoted lieutenant-colonel in July 1695, taking the place of Charles Ross, promoted colonel of the regiment on the death of James Wynne. He served under John Churchill, 1st Duke of Marlborough and was promoted colonel in 1703, and in 1705 he raised and commanded a regiment of foot. The year 1706 saw him a brigadier-general, and in 1709 he was promoted to major-general.

In 1715 Major-General Wynne raised and commanded the regiment later known as the 9th Lancers. From the head of Owen Wynne's Dragoons, he was transferred to the colonelcy of the 5th Horse, later the 4th Dragoon Guards. Promotion to lieutenant-general followed in 1726, and in 1728 Owen Wynne was appointed Commander-in-Chief of the Royal Irish Army. In August 1732 he was transferred from the 5th Horse to the colonelcy of his old regiment, the Royal Irish Dragoons, which appointment he retained until his death in 1737.

Owen Wynne represented Ballyshannon in Parliament from 1715 to 1727, and from 1727 to 1737 was member for Sligo. He was also a Privy Councillor, and in 1736 was Governor of Londonderry. It is stated that he several times refused a peerage.

References
, pp. iv-v.

1665 births
1737 deaths
Irish MPs 1692–1693
Irish MPs 1713–1714
Irish MPs 1715–1727
Irish MPs 1727–1760
Members of the Privy Council of Ireland
Commanders-in-Chief, Ireland
British Army generals
4th Royal Irish Dragoon Guards officers
5th Royal Irish Lancers officers
9th Queen's Royal Lancers officers
Williamite military personnel of the Williamite War in Ireland
British military personnel of the Nine Years' War
British military personnel of the War of the Spanish Succession
Members of the Parliament of Ireland (pre-1801) for County Leitrim constituencies
Members of the Parliament of Ireland (pre-1801) for County Donegal constituencies
Members of the Parliament of Ireland (pre-1801) for County Sligo constituencies
Irish soldiers